Lepanto is a city in Poinsett County, Arkansas, United States. The population was 1,893 at the 2010 census. It is included in the Jonesboro, Arkansas Metropolitan Statistical Area. Lepanto was named for the Greek seaport of Lepanto, site of a great crusade sea battle in 1571.
Lepanto was a site for the filming of the TV movie version of John Grisham's book A Painted House.

Geography
Lepanto is located at  (35.610506, -90.335008).

Demographics

2020 census

As of the 2020 United States census, there were 1,732 people, 713 households, and 533 families residing in the city.

2010 census
As of the 2010 census Lepanto had a population of 1,893. The ethnic and racial makeup of the population was 79.3% non-Hispanic white, 14.8% African-American, 0.1% Native American, 0.1 Asian, 1.7% reporting two or more races, including 1.2% reporting being white and African-American, and 4.3% Hispanic.

2000 census
As of the census of 2000, there were 2,133 people, 851 households, and 595 families residing in the city. The racial makeup of the city was 82.37% White, 15.56% Black or African American, 0.05% Native American, 0.05% Asian, 0.98% from other races, and 0.98% from two or more races.  2.11% of the population were Hispanic or Latino of any race.

There were 851 households, out of which 35.6% had children under the age of 18 living with them, 46.1% were married couples living together, 18.8% had a female householder with no husband present, and 30.0% were non-families. 28.0% of all households were made up of individuals, and 14.8% had someone living alone who was 65 years of age or older.  The average household size was 2.51 and the average family size was 3.04.

In the city, the population was spread out, with 29.1% under the age of 18, 9.4% from 18 to 24, 24.8% from 25 to 44, 22.6% from 45 to 64, and 14.0% who were 65 years of age or older.  The median age was 36 years. For every 100 females, there were 87.3 males.  For every 100 females age 18 and over, there were 81.5 males.

The median income for a household in the city was $22,599, and the median income for a family was $30,074. Males had a median income of $26,977 versus $18,565 for females. The per capita income for the city was $12,550.  About 20.5% of families and 26.3% of the population were below the poverty line, including 37.1% of those under age 18 and 26.2% of those age 65 or over.

Education 
Lepanto is the home of the East Poinsett County School District that provides elementary and secondary education from prekindergarten through grade 12, with students graduating from East Poinsett County High School.

The Lepanto School District consolidated into the East Poinsett district on July 1, 1986.

Notable people

 James R. Hendrix (1925 – 2002) Medal of Honor recipient for actions in the Battle of the Bulge during 1944.
 Marcus Monk (1986 - ) National Football League (NFL) wide receiver drafted by the Chicago Bears; played for the Arkansas Razorbacks and has also been a member of the New York Giants.
 Buddy Jewell (1961 - ) American country music singer; the first winner of the American television talent show Nashville Star.
 Malik Monk (1998 - ) National Basketball Association (NBA) shooting guard who plays for the Sacramento Kings.

See also

References

Cities in Arkansas
Cities in Poinsett County, Arkansas
Jonesboro metropolitan area